Arthur Wollaston (March 1865 – 1933) was an English footballer who played in The Football League for Aston Villa. One source states Wollaston' middle name was William. 

In 1886, aged 21, he signed for Stafford Road where he played for two years.

Arthur played a minor role in the Aston Villa squad during the inaugural Football League season of 1888–1889. He made his League debut at right-half on 8 December 1888 at Trent Bridge when Aston Villa played Notts County. Aston Villa won comfortably, 4–2. Wollaston played 4 League games at right-half and one FA Cup tie at left-half. After playing against Derby County at County Ground Wollaston never played League football again.

References

1865 births
1933 deaths
Sportspeople from Shrewsbury
English footballers
Stafford Road F.C. players
Aston Villa F.C. players
Chirk AAA F.C. players
English Football League players
Association football midfielders